Ghallab Al-Enezi (born 13 June 1999) is a Saudi Arabian professional footballer who plays as a midfielder for Al-Shoulla.

Career
Al-Enezi began his career at the youth team of Al-Shabab. He arrived for the first team in 2019. On 9 August 2019, Al-Enezi signed a three-year contract with Al-Hazem.

On 16 August 2021, Al-Enezi joined Al-Jabalain on loan until the end of the 2021–22 season. On 16 July 2022, Al-Enezi joined Al-Shoulla on a free transfer.

References

External links 
 

Living people
1999 births
Saudi Arabian footballers
Saudi Arabia youth international footballers
Al-Shabab FC (Riyadh) players
Al-Hazem F.C. players
Al-Shoulla FC players
Al-Jabalain FC players
Saudi Professional League players
Saudi First Division League players
Association football midfielders